Inspector Morse is a British detective drama television series based on a series of novels by Colin Dexter. It starred John Thaw as Detective Chief Inspector Morse and Kevin Whately as Sergeant Lewis. The series comprises 33 two-hour episodes (100 minutes excluding commercials) produced between 1987 and 2000. Dexter made uncredited cameo appearances in all but three of the episodes.

In 2018, the series was named the greatest British crime drama of all time by Radio Times’ readers. In 2000, the series was ranked 42 on the 100 Greatest British Television Programmes compiled by the British Film Institute.

It was followed by the spin-off Lewis and prequel Endeavour.

Overview
The series was made by Zenith Productions for Central Independent Television, and first shown in the UK on the ITV network of regional broadcasters. Between 1995 and 1996 the commissioning company was Carlton Television, and towards the end of the series it was a joint venture by Carlton and WGBH.

Every episode involved a new murder investigation and depicted a complete story. Writer Anthony Minghella scripted three, including the first, "The Dead of Jericho"', which aired on 6 January 1987 featuring Gemma Jones, Patrick Troughton, and James Laurenson. Its other writers included Julian Mitchell (10 episodes), Daniel Boyle (five), and Alma Cullen (four), and its directors included John Madden (four episodes), Herbert Wise (three), Peter Hammond (three), Adrian Shergold (three), and Danny Boyle (two).

"Morse" is frequently repeated on the principal and subsidiary ITV channels (ITV, ITV2, ITV3, ITV4) in the UK, although repeat broadcasts also aired on Channel 4 during the show's original run. Repeats are also shown on television channels in other European countries and in Australia.

Episodes

Cast and crew
Main characters:
John Thaw as Detective Chief Inspector Endeavour Morse
Kevin Whately as Detective Sergeant Robbie Lewis
James Grout as Chief Superintendent Strange

Other recurring characters:
Peter Woodthorpe as Dr Max DeBryn (pathologist) in series 1–2
Amanda Hillwood as Dr Grayling Russell (pathologist) in series 3
Clare Holman as Dr Laura Hobson (pathologist) in specials

Main production credits:
Kenny McBain, producer of series 1–2
Chris Burt, producer of series 3, 7 and specials
David Lascelles, producer of series 4–5
Deirdre Keir, producer of series 6
Ted Childs, executive producer
Rebecca Eaton, American executive producer of episodes 31–33
Laurie Greenwood, associate producer

Production

Morse was played by John Thaw and his assistant, Detective Sergeant Lewis, by Kevin Whately. The character of Lewis was transformed from the elderly Welshman and ex-boxer of the novels to a much younger Geordie police sergeant with a family, as a foil to Morse's cynical streak. Morse's first name, Endeavour, is revealed on only one occasion, when he explains to a lady friend that his father was obsessed with Captain James Cook, so he was named after HMS Endeavour. On other occasions, he usually answers, "Morse. Everyone just calls me Morse." or dryly replies "Inspector", when asked what his first name is.

Thaw appreciated that Morse was different from many other classic detectives such as Hercule Poirot and Sherlock Holmes. Morse was brilliant, but he was not always right. He often arrested the wrong person or came to the wrong conclusion. As a result, unlike many classic sleuths, Morse does not always simply arrest his culprit; ironic circumstances have the case end and the crime brought to him. Morse was also a romantic, frequently mildly and gently flirting with or asking out colleagues, witnesses, or suspects—occasionally bordering on the unprofessional—but he had little success in love.

Morse is a character whose talents and intelligence are being wasted in positions that fail to match his abilities. It is mentioned several times that Morse would have been promoted above and beyond Chief Inspector at Thames Valley Police CID, but his cynicism and lack of ambition, coupled also with veiled hints that he may have made enemies in high places, frustrate his progression despite his Oxford connections. In the episode "Second Time Around", it is revealed that Morse opposed capital punishment and long sentences, which was upheld by his former superior who later became assistant commissioner of Metropolitan Police and his former colleague thought of him as "a poor policeman and a very good detective".

Morse is a highly credible detective and a plausible human being. His penchant for drinking, his life filled with difficult personal relationships and his negligence toward his health, however, make him a more tragic character than previous classic sleuths.

Morse's eventual death in the final episode "The Remorseful Day" is caused by heart problems exacerbated by heavy drinking, although in the books his death is diabetes-related.

Inspector Morse was filmed for ITV using 16 mm film stock. Since its production, a number of releases of the show on DVD have been made using various remastered editions of the episodes in the 4:3 ratio. In recent years, ITV has overseen a high-definition restoration of the drama from the original 16 mm negatives so as to boost the HD content on ITV3 HD. Many of these HD episodes retain the original 4:3 ratio, though some of the later episodes (including the series finale) have been opened into a 16:9 widescreen frame. These more recent remastered editions have not been released on Blu-ray.

Morse's interests
Morse had diverse passions: music (especially opera; Mozart and Wagner among his favourites), poetry, art, the classics, British real ale, classic cars and cryptic crossword puzzles. When seen at home, Morse is usually listening to music on his Roksan Xerxes record player, solving a crossword, reading classic literature, or drinking ale. In his home, the living room had a chess set containing classical Staunton chess pieces while the art on the walls includes etchings of Roman ruins by G.B. Piranesi from his Vedute di Roma series. While working, Morse subsists on quickly downed pints of ale in pubs, usually bought by Lewis, who struggles to keep up. Many of his cases touch on Morse's interests and often his knowledge helps him solve them.

In "The Death of the Self", the episode ends with Morse seeing one of the characters, an opera singer recovering from a long absence due to stage fright, make her "comeback" performance at the amphitheatre in Verona, while in "Twilight of the Gods", he investigates the life of one of his opera idols, Gwladys Probert, a world-famous soprano. In "Who Killed Harry Field?", the murder victim is a painter and in "The Way Through the Woods", Morse researches the Pre-Raphaelite movement to aid his investigations.

In several episodes, Morse's crossword-solving ability helps him to spot people who have changed their identities by creating a new name using an anagram. In "Masonic Mysteries", he is maliciously implicated in the murder of a woman when his Times newspaper with the crossword puzzle completed in his handwriting is placed in the victim's house. In that same episode, the writer names Morse's old inspector from when he was a detective sergeant as 'Macnutt', an homage to D.S. Macnutt, the famous and influential Observer puzzle setter 'Ximenes'.

In "The Sins of the Fathers", he investigates a murder in a brewery-owning family and in the first episode of the series, "The Dead of Jericho", he compares the life of a dead woman with that of Jocasta, the mother of Oedipus. The same episode also introduced his Jaguar Mark 2 automobile, which is damaged at the beginning and the end of the story, being used to prevent the escape of the perpetrators. His interest in classic cars is also explored in "Driven to Distraction", in which he suspects a car salesman of murder. He seems to dislike Jeremy Boynton so strongly that when he refers to Morse's own Jaguar as "she", this convinces Morse of his guilt.

In "Cherubim and Seraphim", he investigates the suicide of his niece and discusses with her English teacher her interest in the poet Sylvia Plath, who also killed herself. The teacher defends the teaching of Plath's poetry to students, saying that her suicide would not influence students to do the same. Investigating the killing of a retired detective in "Second Time Around", Morse is haunted by an early case of his in which a young girl had been murdered and an obvious suspect could have very well been innocent.

Music

The theme and incidental music for the series were written by Barrington Pheloung and used a motif based on the Morse code for "M.O.R.S.E.": (--/---/.-./.../.). The composer works the five letters into four 3-beat bars as follows :   The motif is played solo at the beginning and recurs all the way through. In the documentary, The Mystery of Morse, Pheloung states that he occasionally spelled out the name of the killer in Morse code in the music, or alternatively spelled out the name of another character as a red herring. The series also included opera and other classical genres as part of its soundtrack, most notably pieces by Richard Wagner and Wolfgang Amadeus Mozart, whose Magic Flute is a significant plot device in one episode.

Locations
Beaumont College (in the TV episode "The Last Enemy") and Lonsdale College (in "The Riddle of the Third Mile", the book on which "The Last Enemy" was based) are both fictional Oxford colleges. The real Brasenose College and Exeter College were used to represent Lonsdale, while Corpus Christi was used for Beaumont. Both fictional names are from real streets in Oxford; a real Lonsdale College exists at Lancaster University (named for the adjacent Lancashire region of Lonsdale Hundred, as is the Oxford street) but has no relation to Dexter's fictional Lonsdale. St Saviour's College in the episode "Fat Chance" is also fictitious; New College was used as the location for it. Merton and University College were used for the fictional Beaufort College in the episode "The Infernal Serpent". Christ Church appears in "The Daughters of Cain" as the fictional Wolsey College; it was founded by Thomas Wolsey. In a number of episodes, the main quad at Wadham College is used, especially the classic view as seen from the main entrance—unlike the students, the actors are allowed to walk on the grass. Eton College was used to depict various parts of Oxford through the series, notably the county court in the episode "The Silent World of Nicholas Quinn", while St John's Beaumont School, Old Windsor, became the Foreign Examinations Syndicate in the same episode, with both external and internal filming taking place there. Many of the generic locations used throughout the series, including Morse's house, were situated in Ealing, London, amongst the residential streets to the north of Ealing Broadway. Some scenes were also filmed at Brunel University and Hillingdon Hospital, both in west London. The Port of Dover was used for the "Deceived by Flight" episode.

Props
The Regency red 1960 Jaguar Mark 2 2.4L car (with number plate 248 RPA) used by Morse throughout the television series became synonymous with the main character, despite Morse's driving a Lancia in the early novels (after the start of the TV series, the novels changed to the Jaguar, but no reference is made in the books as to why or when Morse changes cars). The Jaguar was given away in a competition a year after filming ended and in 2002, it was auctioned for £53,200, many times the going rate for a "normal" 2.4. In November 2005, it was sold again for more than £100,000.

Spin-offs

Lewis

The spin-off Lewis, starring Kevin Whately as the now-promoted (and widowed, making the character's situation closer to Morse's) Inspector Lewis, premiered in 2006 on ITV. Nine series were made with the last concluding in November 2015. It aired in the USA on PBS under the title Inspector Lewis. On 2 November 2015, ITV announced that the show would end after its ninth series, following the decision made by Kevin Whately and Laurence Fox to retire from their roles in the series. Whately announced that the show had gone on long enough, with his character having done many stories between Morse and Lewis after he took on the role 30 years ago.

Endeavour

In 2012, ITV aired a two-hour special prequel film, Endeavour, portraying a young Morse, with author Colin Dexter's participation. Set in 1965, Shaun Evans plays the young Detective Constable Morse, who is preparing to hand in his resignation when he becomes involved in an investigation into a missing schoolgirl. This was followed in 2013 by the first series comprising four episodes. Filming for the ninth and last series, set in 1972, began on 22 May 2022.

Home media
In Australia, Region 4, the entire series of Inspector Morse has been released on DVD. The first releases were 2 episodes per discs later followed by four volumes of these same releases in boxed sets.

Inspector Morse: Silent And Dead – 21 July 2005 (Episodes: The Dead of Jericho; The Silent World of Nicholas Quinn)
Inspector Morse: Dead Men Tell No Tales – 21 July 2005 (Episodes: Service of All The Dead; The Wolvercote Tongue)
Inspector Morse: A Tangled Web – 21 July 2005 (Episodes: Last Seen Wearing; The Settling of The Sun)
Inspector Morse: More Than Meets The Eye – 21 July 2005 (Episodes: Last Bus to Woodstock; The Ghost in The Machine)
Inspector Morse: The Great Leveller – 18 August 2005 (Episodes: The Last Enemy; Deceived By Flight)
Inspector Morse: Love And Death – 18 August 2005 (Episodes: The Secret of Bay 5B; Promised Land)
Inspector Morse: The Coward's Revenge – 18 August 2005 (Episodes: The Sins of The Fathers; Happy Families)
Inspector Morse: Dial M for Morse – 18 August 2005 (Episodes: Masonic Mysteries; Second Time Around)
Inspector Morse: Deception – 22 September 2005 (Episodes: Fat Chance; Who Killed Harry Field)
Inspector Morse: Foreign Lands – 22 September 2005 (Episodes: Greeks Bearing Gifts; Promised Land)
Inspector Morse: Blood Relatives – 22 September 2005 (Episodes: Dead on Time; Happy Families)
Inspector Morse: Dying To Leave – 22 September 2005 (Episodes: Death of The Self; Absolute Conviction)
Inspector Morse: Spoil The Child – 20 October 2005 (Episodes: Cherubim and Seraphim; Deadly Slumber)
Inspector Morse: God and the Devil – 20 October 2005 (Episodes: The Day of The Devil; Twilight of The Gods)
Inspector Morse: Daughters and Lovers – 20 October 2005 (Episodes: The Daughters of Cain; The Way Through The Woods)
Inspector Morse: Yesterday and Today – 20 October 2005 (Episodes: The Wench is Dead; Death Is Now My Neighbour)
Inspector Morse: The Remorseful Day – 20 October 2005 (Episodes: The Remorseful Day; The Mystery of Morse; The Last Morse)
Inspector Morse: The Complete Collection – 2005/2006 (Packaged as all individual releases plus 38 Page Booklet)
Inspector Morse: Volume 1 – 1 December 2005 (Repackaged 6 June 2007 in a single 25mm case) (Contains: Silent and Dead; Dead Men Tell No Tales; A Tangled Web We Weave; More Than Meets The Eye)
Inspector Morse: Volume 2 – 1 December 2005 (Repackaged 1 December 2007 in a single 25mm case) (Contains: The Great Leveller; Love And Death; The Coward's Revenge; Dial M For Morse)
Inspector Morse: Volume 3 – 16 February 2006 (Packaged in a single 25mm case) (Contains: Deception; Foreign Lands; Blood Relatives; Dying To Leave)
Inspector Morse: Volume 4 – 16 February 2006 (Packaged in a single 25mm case) (Contains: Spoil The Child; Gods and the Devil; Daughters and Lovers; Yesterday And Today; Remorseful Day)
Inspector Morse: The Complete Collection – 2 November 2010 (Packaged as 4 x 25mm cases and a 34 Page booklet)
Inspector Morse: Volume One – 3 July 2013 (Distributed by Roadshow Entertainment) (Contains the same titles as first release. Repackaged to a Single 14mm Case version)
Inspector Morse: Volume Two – 3 July 2013 (Distributed by Roadshow Entertainment) (Contains the same titles as first release. Repackaged to a Single 14mm Case version)
 Inspector Morse: Volume Three – 3 July 2013 (Distributed by Roadshow Entertainment) (Contains the same titles as first release. Repackaged to a Single 14mm Case version)
Inspector Morse: Volume Four – 3 July 2013 (Distributed by Roadshow Entertainment) (Contains the same titles as first release. Repackaged to a Single 14mm Case version)
Inspector Morse: The Complete Case Files – 7 August 2013 (Distributed by Roadshow Entertainment) (Contains the four 14mm Single Case version of each Volume 1–4 in a Box Set.)

References

External links

Granada International's Official Inspector Morse website
Official Inspector Morse website
.
Inspector Morse at the British Film Institute.
.
Inspector Morse at the MBC's. Encyclopedia of Television.
.
Inspector Morse episode guide

1980s British drama television series
1990s British drama television series
2000s British drama television series
1980s British mystery television series
1990s British mystery television series
1990s British crime drama television series
2000s British mystery television series
2000s British crime drama television series
1987 British television series debuts
2000 British television series endings
Anthony Award-winning works
Carlton Television
British detective television series
Television
ITV television dramas
Television shows based on British novels
Television shows set in Oxford
Television series by ITV Studios
English-language television shows
Television shows produced by Central Independent Television